Maimekden (or May Mekden) is a village in Tigray Region, located 27 kilometers south of Wukro. It is located on the crossing of Ethiopian Highway 2 and the Mai Mekden river.

Administrative division 
In Imperial times, Maimekden used to be the administrative center of the Wenberta woreda, part of the Enderta Province. Nowadays, the new Wenberta district has its center in the town of Atsbi and Maimekden is located in the Kilte Awulaelo district with Wukro as its administrative center.

References 

Populated places in the Tigray Region